Guy Ferre, known as the younger, was a 14th century Gascon knight and administrator who served as Seneschal of Gascony (1298-99 and 1308-1309).

Ferre the son of John Ferre. He was a household knight of Eleanor, Queen consort of England between 1277-90 and household steward between 1288-90.  Appointed on 12 March 1308 as Seneschal of Gascony, replacing John de Havering, Ferres served until he was replaced by John de Hastings in 1309. He was married to Eleanor Mountender and died without issue in 1323.

References

Further reading

Year of birth unknown
1323 deaths
Seneschals of Gascony
14th-century English people
Medieval English knights